The Hamilton Bulldogs are a major junior ice hockey team in the Ontario Hockey League (OHL) that began to play in the 2015–16 season. Based in Hamilton, Ontario, Canada, the Bulldogs play their home games at FirstOntario Centre. They were purchased by owner Michael Andlauer in March 2015 and relocated to Hamilton after 34 years in Belleville, where they were known as the Bulls. The Bulldogs won OHL championships in 2018, and 2022.

The Bulldogs replaced the American Hockey League team of the same name, also formerly owned by Andlauer. The original team played in Hamilton from 1996 to 2015, after which they moved to St. John's, Newfoundland and Labrador, to become the second incarnation of the St. John's IceCaps.

In February 2023, due to upcoming renovations to the FirstOntario Centre, the Bulldogs announced they would be temporarily relocating to the Brantford Civic Centre and renaming as the Brantford Bulldogs for at least three seasons, beginning in the 2023–24 OHL season. The Civic Centre will also be undergoing over $9 million in renovations, funded by both the Bulldogs and the City of Brantford.

History
On March 12, 2015, Michael Andlauer announced that he had acquired the Belleville Bulls and that they would move into the FirstOntario Centre for the 2015–16 season as the Hamilton Bulldogs. The Hamilton Bulldogs  which played in the American Hockey League had been sold to the Montreal Canadiens and moved to St. John's, Newfoundland, for the 2015–16 season.

Coaches
2015–2016, George Burnett
2016–2018, John Gruden
2018–2019, Dave Matsos
2019–2020, Vince Laise
2020, Steve Staios (interim)
2021–present, Jay McKee

General managers
2015–2016, George Burnett
2016–2022, Steve Staios (6)
2022–present, Matt Turek

Notable alumni

Nick Caamano
MacKenzie Entwistle
Matt Luff
Arthur Kaliyev
Mason Marchment
Mason McTavish
Christian Mieritz
Marian Studenic
Robert Thomas
Arber Xhekaj

Season-by-season results

Regular season
Legend: OTL = Overtime loss, SL = Shootout loss

Playoffs
2015–16: Did not qualify.
2016–17: Lost to Kingston Frontenacs 4-games-to-3 in conference quarter-finals.
2017–18: Defeated Ottawa 67's 4-games-to-1 in conference quarter-finals.Defeated Niagara IceDogs 4-games-to-1 in conference semi-finals.Defeated Kingston Frontenacs 4-games-to-1 in conference finals.Won championship vs Sault Ste. Marie Greyhounds 4-games-to-2.Third-place finish in 2018 Memorial Cup.
2018–19: Lost to Ottawa 67's 4-games-to-0 in conference quarter-finals.
2019–20: Playoffs cancelled
2020–21: Season cancelled
2021–22: Defeated Peterborough Petes 4-games-to-0 in conference quarter-finals.Defeated Mississauga Steelheads 4-games-to-0 in conference semi-finals.Defeated North Bay Battalion 4-games-to-0 in conference finals.Won championship vs Windsor Spitfires 4-games-to-3.Second-place finish in 2022 Memorial Cup.

See also
List of ice hockey teams in Ontario

References

External links
 

2015 establishments in Ontario
Ice hockey clubs established in 2015
Ice hockey teams in Hamilton, Ontario
Ontario Hockey League teams